The following is a list of all the squads of the national teams participating in the 2015 FIFA U-17 World Cup.

Each team had to name a squad of 21 players (three of whom must be goalkeepers) by the FIFA deadline. The squads were announced on 8 October 2015.

All players of its representative team must have been born on or after 1 January 1998. Players in boldface have been capped at full international level at some point in their career.

Group A

Head coach:  Miguel Ponce

Head coach:  Dario Bašić

Head coach:  Emmanuel Amunike

Head coach:  Richie Williams

Group B

Manager:  Carlos Amadeu

Head coach:  Neil Dewsnip

Head coach:  Hamidou Camara

Manager:  Choi Jin-cheul

Group C

Manager:  Miguel Ángel Lemme

Head coach: Tony Vidmar

Head coach:  Christian Wück

Head Coach:  Mario Alberto Arteaga

Group D

Head coach:  Bob Browaeys

Head coach:  José Rodríguez

Head coach: José Valladares

Head coach:  Baye Ba

Group E

Head coach:  Marcelo Herrera

Head coach:  Yon Kwang-mu

Head coach:  Mikhail Galaktionov

Head coach:  Molefi Ntseki

Group F

Head coach:  Jean-Claude Giuntini

Head coach:  Danny Hay

Head coach:  Carlos Jara Saguier

Head coach:  Mohammad Al-Attar

Notes

References

External links 
Official Players List

FIFA U-17 World Cup squads